Following is a list of justices of the Washington Supreme Court.

Current justices

Notable territorial judges
Orange Jacobs, 1869–1875 
Obadiah B. McFadden, 1854–1861
Ethelbert Patterson Oliphant, 1861–1865
William Strong, 1858–1861
George Turner, 1885–1888
Francis A. Chenoweth 1854–1858

All justices

References

Washington
Justices